Clydesdale Harriers are an athletics club, founded in 1885. It was Scotland's first amateur open athletics club with the object of promoting amateur athletics generally and cross country running in particular.

History

Foundations
Clydesdale Harriers was founded in May 1885 and based in Glasgow and had five sections within the city boundaries and sections were also maintained in Lanarkshire, Dunbartonshire, Ayrshire, Renfrewshire as well as in the towns of Greenock, Ayr and Airdrie. As the sections developed they became independent clubs and such as Greenock Glenpark, Monklands and Paisley Harriers clubs owe their start to Clydesdale, as well as private schools' former-pupil clubs (such as Fettesian-Lorettonian Club) and teams from universities. As was common, sportsmen were often affiliated to clubs in different sports and Clydesdale had links with cycling, boxing, skating and football clubs with a particularly strong link with the Rangers club. Indeed, several founders of the Rangers were also founder members of the Harriers. When Celtic FC was founded they signed up several Harriers including Tom Maley and his brother Willie, who went on to become one of their greatest managers of all time and incidentally President of the Scottish Amateur Athletics Association (SAAA). Up to the first war, the club provided numerous champions and won 14 Scottish National Team Championships.

After the war
Over 200 members were lost in the Great War and the club went from a national club to a local club and settled in Clydebank as its base in the early 1920s. Success was hard to come by, after the War many members just did not want to come back, the entire Committee (with two exceptions) were killed in the hostilities and the Depression meant that many had to work hard including weekends or leave the district in search of work. Nevertheless, the club built up gradually and just when they were starting to 'come good' the Second War came along. The really bright spot in this period was the running and winning of the Ladies Cross Country team, which won the cross country championship of Scotland in 1936/37/38 and produced the only internationalist in the form of Jean Tait. Nevertheless, the club had many good servants during this period who made sure that during the 1939-45 period a War Continuation Committee was in existence setting its sights on a quicker return to action than had been possible in 1918.

The 1945–60 spell saw the club take part in many innovative activities and win many trophies with a host of top class athletes. The first open club in the country, Clydesdale had been the first to set up a Junior (Under 18) section in 1918 and one of the first with a Ladies Section (1931). It organised one of the first annual races for Youths (the Johnny Morgan Youth Ballot Team Race) in 1946 and it was a member of the CH who moved that there be a Scottish Championship for Under 15 Boys. As far as racing was concerned, John Wright won the national Junior Cross Country Championship twice and the Senior Men's team was third in 1955. The club helped set up the Dunbartonshire County Association with Garscube Harriers, Dumbarton AAC and Vale of Leven AAC a very successful Association still going strong: at its peak in the late 1980s there were 13 clubs in membership.

1960s to present
Between 1960 and 1985, the club performed well in all the endurance events with athletes including Phil Dolan, Robert McWatt, Allan Faulds, Ian Leggett and Doug Gemmell all representing Scotland at various levels. In track and field the sole internationalist was Ian Logie, who competed in the pole vault for Scotland three times in one year in the mid-1960s. Over the 1970s the club won the Maley Trophy, never before won by the club, as West District Cross Country Champions no fewer than three times with several second and third places in the same period.

In 1985 the club entered the Scottish Men's Track and Field League and competed at a very high level in all events up to the early 2000s, e.g. 1:49 for 800 metres, 50 metres+ hammer throwers, 7 metres + long jumpers, 2 metres+ high jumpers and so on. There were four GB representatives at Under 20 or Senior level (Des Roache, Ewan Calvert and Grant Graham at 800/1500 and Jason Allan in the high jump) as well as 20+ Scottish internationalists. The cross country runners all did well and in 1995 won the West District Relays—a title that had never before come the way of the club. In 2003 Graeme Reid won the Scottish National Senior Men's Cross Country Champion to be the first Clydesdale to win it since Dunky Wright exactly 80 years earlier. The club had then produced Scottish Champions in three separate centuries with many winners in the 19th century and several after 1900 before Graeme came along and won it in 2003. No other club will be able to match it until the 22nd century since none of the clubs who won before 1900 are still in existence.

The club progresses and in the past five years has had its first ever woman president Aileen Scott and its first ever woman Secretary in Yvonne Green. In the early 21st century, its main base is at St Peter the Apostle High School.

References

Sources
 Clydesdale Harriers: A Centenary History 1885-1985 by Brian McAusland 
 Runs Will Take Place Whatever the Weather by Colin A Shields (Official History of the Cross Country Union of Scotland)

External links
official website

Athletics clubs in Scotland
1885 establishments in Scotland
Sports clubs in Scotland
Clydebank
Sports clubs established in 1885
Sport in West Dunbartonshire